Ethmia bisignata is a moth in the family Depressariidae. It was described by Andras Kun in 2002. It is found on Sulawesi in Indonesia.

References

Moths described in 2002
bisignata